Hideki Yamauchi (山内英輝 - Yamauchi Hideki; born October 24, 1988) is a Japanese professional racing driver.

Complete Super GT Results 
(key) (Races in bold indicate pole position) (Races in italics indicate fastest lap)

* Season still in progress.

References 

1988 births
Living people
Japanese racing drivers
Japanese Formula 3 Championship drivers
Super GT drivers

TOM'S drivers
Nürburgring 24 Hours drivers
B-Max Racing drivers